= Vesna Anastasia Božović =

German-Montenegrin artist

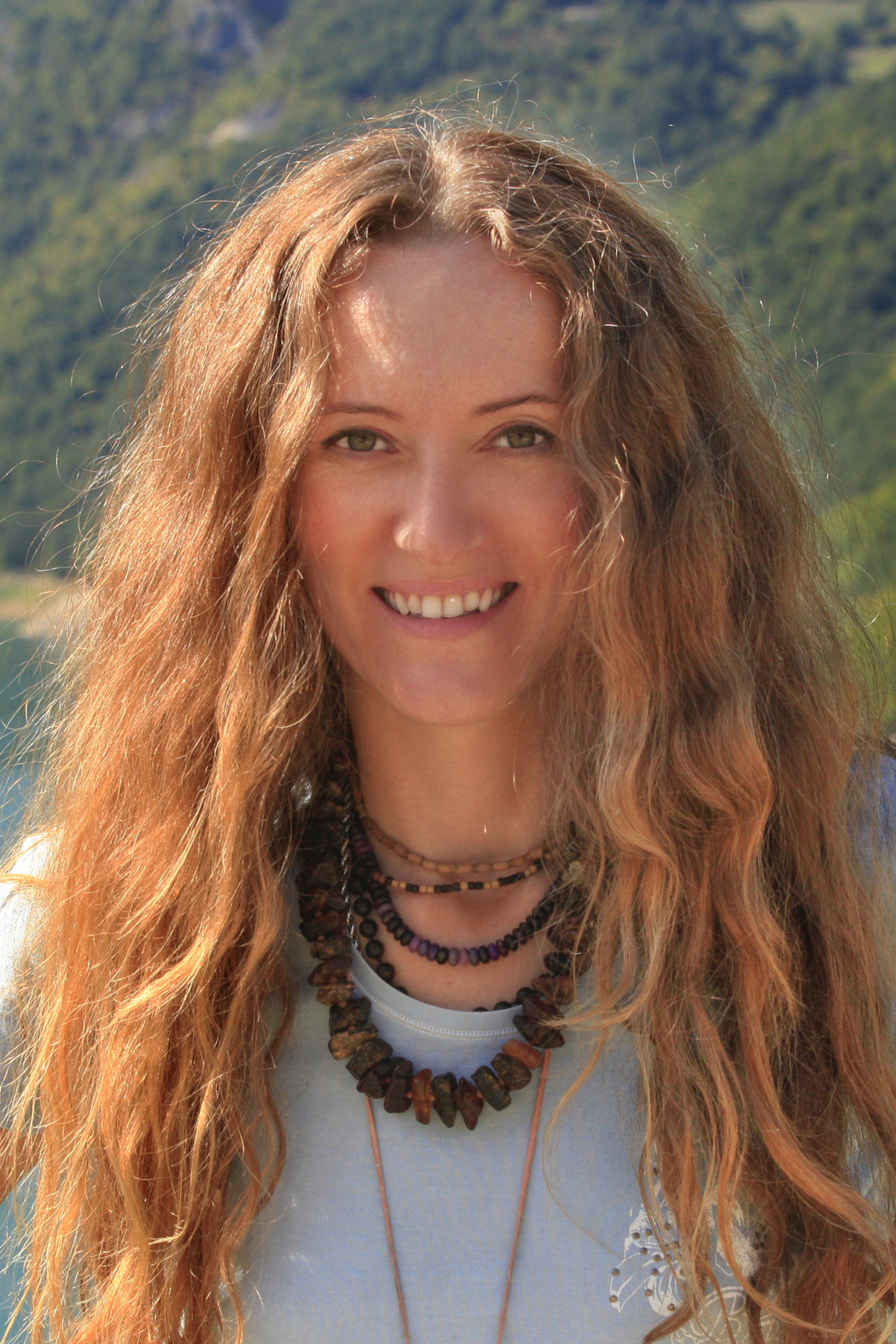
- Vesna Anastasia Božović (2008)
- Born: February 6, 1970 (age 56); Nikšić, Montenegro
- Education: MA in English and MA in Psychology, Vedic Vaishnav Hindu Priestess
- Occupations: Artist, psychologist, musician, spiritualist, priestess
- Parents: Mikonja Božović (father); Milka Božović (mother)
- Relatives: Vladan Božović (Brother)
- Website: vesnaanastasia.com

Vesna Anastasia Božović is a German/Montenegrin artist, psychologist, poet, musician, author, music video director, and member of the band East Elysium.

== Early life and education ==
Božović was born in Nikšić, Montenegro. In the 1990s, she studied ancient Vedic culture and philosophy, Sanskrit, the cosmology of the East, and the Brahmin priest order in Germany and India. She has two Masters in English language and literature, and in Psychology from the Faculty of Philosophy, University of Montenegro.

== Career ==
She is the vocalist and lyricist of the band East Elysium. As a videographer and music video director she worked with many Montenegrin artists. She also co-directed the music video of the song “Lizard”, along with Roy B. David, an Israeli Thai movie director.

She co-directed the film 72 Hours with Susanne Horizon Fränzel, a German director, which was screened at the New Delhi Film Festival.

In 2025, she directed East Elysium's music Video "Embrace" that won the best music video award at Kinodrome Film Festival (USA). In November, it received awards at Cineverse International Film Festival, Luminary Independent Film Fiesta, France, Indian Independent Film Festival, India, and Fusion Film International Film Festival, NewYork.

== Books ==
- Stopa moja Indija (Colored footprints- Live My India) a novel
- Never Again Alone (a collection of poetry)
