= East Elysium =

Montenegrin and German alternative progressive band

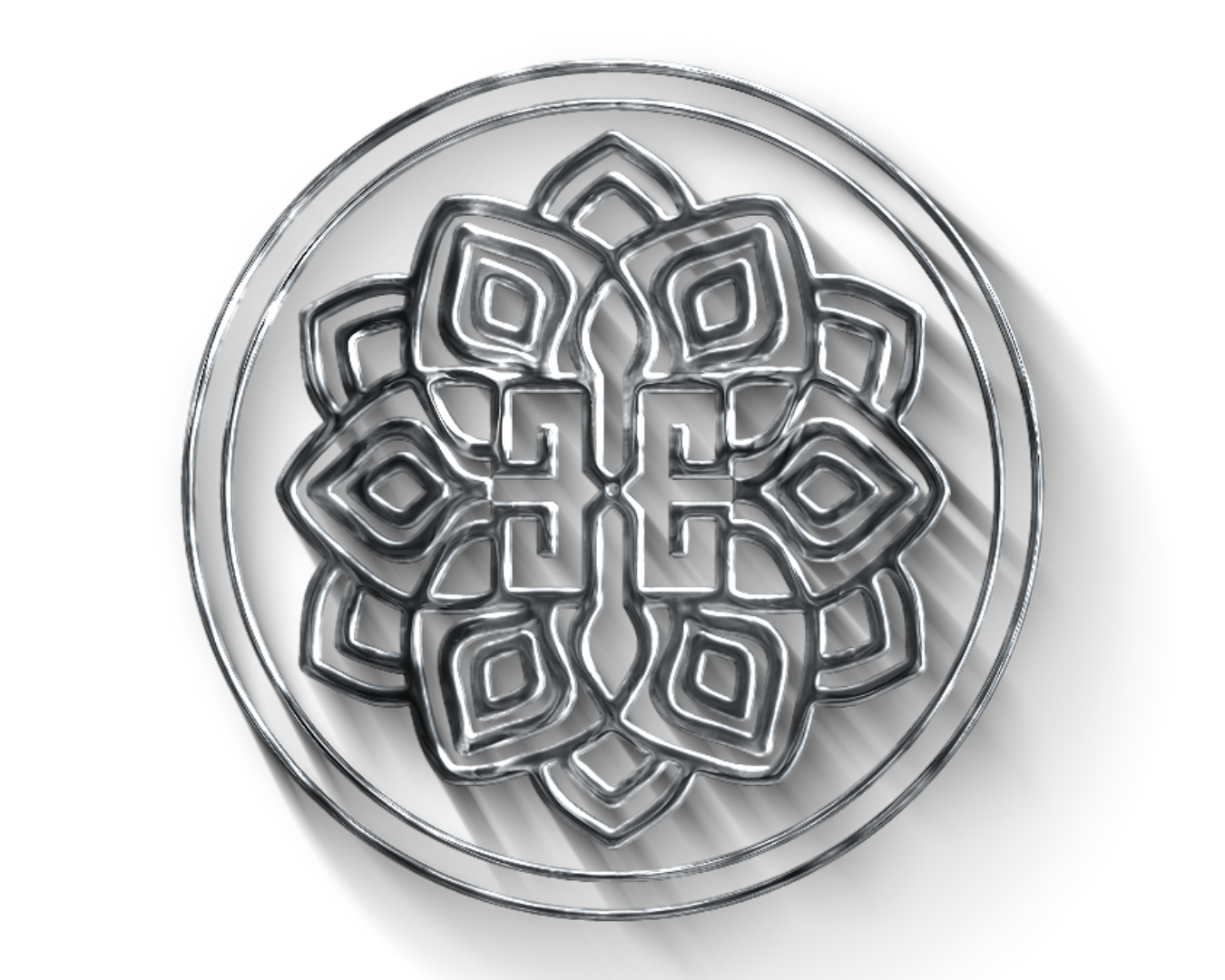

Background information
- Origin: Montenegro/Germany
- Genre: Alternative/progressive/ambiental/kirtan
- Years active: 2009 – Present
- Label: Online Spotify
- Members: Vesna Anastasia Božović; Mina Simonovic; Danilo Vuletic; Anto Lutovac; Milivoje Kljajic
- Past members: Milutin Radonjic; Mili Bozovic; Sonja Vojvodic; Dejan Milosavljevic; Ana Lopušina

East Elysium is a Montenegrin and German alternative progressive band.

== History ==
In December 2009, East Elysium was formed in Nikšić Montenegro. The band was initiated by Milutin Radonjic, Danilo Vuletić, and Vesna Anastasia Božović. Some of the band members live in Germany, India, and Serbia.

In 2025, the band won DJ Chris Arthur Award in the category of Music Videography, at KinoDrome: International Motion Picture & Screenplay Festival, for their song "Embrace". In November, it received awards at Cineverse International Film Festival, Luminary Independent Film Fiesta, France, Indian Independent Film Festival, India, and Fusion Film International Film Festival, NewYork.

In 2026, it received another award atCelluloid Dreams International Film Festival.

== Musical style and influences ==
East Elysium's name was inspired by Friedrich Schiller's poem "Elysium". It has a philosophical approach towards music and arts, emphasizing that sound works as a pathway toward spiritual enlightenment, and living music impacts the listener's soul, which is translated into their emotions.

== Band members ==
East Elysium members are Danilo Vuletić (drums, keyboard, bass, and back vocals), Vesna Anastasia Božović (lead vocal), Mina Simonović (back vocal), Milivoje Kljajić (solo guitar), and Anto Lutovac (rhythm guitar).

== Collaborations ==
East Elysium's album 'Angel' had a significant collaboration with Ivana Janković, Aleksandra Radić from Belgrade, Dov from Las Vegas, and Dave Norwoods from Los Angeles, also with Onur Hunum from Turkey, Akim Welsch from Germany and Bojan Dobrilović from Nikšić.

== Discography ==
=== Albums ===
- Angel
- Transpassed Reality

=== Singles ===
- Angel
- Breathe me
- Shiva Shambhu
- Embrace
- Wings (Who you are)
- Feel
- Rādhe Śyām East Elysium ft Rādhā Kīrtan Band
